Senator Stout may refer to:

Barry Stout (1936–2016), Pennsylvania State Senate
Byron G. Stout (1829–1896), Michigan State Senate
Jacob Stout (1764–1855), Delaware State Senate
James Huff Stout (1848–1910), Wisconsin State Senate
Lansing Stout (1828–1871), Oregon State Senate
Richard R. Stout (1912–1986), New Jersey State Senate
Tom Stout (1879–1965), Montana State Senate